Sataspes was a Persian navigator and cavalry commander whose name is derived from Sat (=100 sad) and Asp (= Horse, Asb). He is also credited with originating the term "horse latitudes".

Sataspes (who, according to Herodotus, was Xerxes I's cousin by his mother being Darius I's  sister) had been condemned to death for kidnapping and raping Megabyzus's daughter. However his mother, Atossa, successfully convinced Xerxes to change the punishment to a more severe one - Sataspes was tasked to circumnavigate Africa. He took an Egyptian ship and crew, sailed through the Pillars of Hercules, and proceeded south for many months, but returned to Egypt without successfully completing his task. He claimed that at the farthest point he reached, he encountered a "dwarfish race, who wore a dress made from the palm tree", and that he was forced to return because his ship stopped and would not sail any further. Xerxes did not accept this excuse and had him put to death. However, it has been suggested that Sataspes could have simply encountered the Benguela Current, which prevented him from sailing any farther.

References
Iran Chamber - Iranians, Pioneers of Navigation in the Persian Gulf Iranchamber.com
 History of Iran: Histories of Herodotus, Book 4 Iranchamber.com
 The Voyage of Hanno Metrum.org

Explorers of Africa
Persian explorers
Navigators
Ancient explorers